Glória Halász is a Hungarian film director.

Career 
Glória Halász was born in Budapest. She attended Eötvös Loránd University.

Halász has directed several full-length documentaries which have been featured in international film festivals. Rupa's Boutique (2017), about a group of Indian women who survived acid attacks, was awarded the Grand Jury Award of the United Nations Association Film Festival.

Filmography 
 Iron Curtain (2011)
 Dr. Lala (2014)
 What a Circus! (2016)
 Rupa's Boutique (2017)
 Three Dances (2018)
 Alla Zingara (2019)

Awards 

 Grand Jury Award for Best Documentary – UNAFF (United Nations Association Film Festival), Palo Alto, Stanford, United States
 Best Feature Film Award – WOMEN Media Arts and Film Festival, Sydney, Australia 
 Grand Prix for the Best Movie of the Festival – Prvi Kadar International Film Festival, Sarajevo, Bosnia and Herzegovina
 Best Documentary – Opuzen Film Festival, Croatia
 Best Documentary – CineFest International Film Festival
 Best Documentary – National Independent Film Festival

References

External links 
 

Year of birth missing (living people)
Living people
Hungarian film directors
Hungarian women film directors
Documentary film directors
Women documentary filmmakers